Richard L. Doty, Ph.D. is a professor of psychology and otorhinolaryngology at the University of Pennsylvania. He has also been the director of the University of Pennsylvania's Smell and Taste Center since 1980.

Doty is considered a world-renowned researcher in the field of olfactory functioning and dysfunction (anosmia). Dr. Doty is a pioneer in the development and validation of practical quantitative tests of olfaction, including the University of Pennsylvania Smell Identification Test, or UPSIT.

Education and Training 

Doty received his Bachelor of Science degree from Colorado State University in 1966. He was awarded a Master of Arts in experimental psychology with an emphasis in psychophysics from California State University San Jose in conjunction with NASA’s Ames Research Center in 1968. Doty earned his Ph.D. in Comparative Psychology and Zoology from Michigan State University in 1971.

He was a postdoctoral research fellow at the University of California, Berkeley from 1971 to 1973 in the field of behavioral endocrinology and was advised by Dr. Frank Beach. At the Monell Chemical Senses Center in Philadelphia, Pennsylvania, he was a Postdoctoral Fellow from 1973-1974 and then Director of the Human Olfaction Section from 1974-1978.

Writing 

Dr. Doty has published over 400 papers in peer-reviewed journals related to olfactory and gustatory function, and is the editor or author of nine books.  He is the editor of the third edition of the Handbook of Olfaction and Gustation (Wiley Blackwell, 2015), considered by experts in the chemical senses field to be a crucial text.  Among his other books are the Neurology of Olfaction with Christopher Hawkes (Cambridge University Press, 2009), and The Great Pheromone Myth (Johns Hopkins University Press, 2010).

Awards 
Dr. Doty has received multiple awards. In 1996 he received a James A. Shannon Award from the National Institutes of Health. Doty received the Olfactory Research Fund's Scientific Sense of Smell Award in 2000. In 2003 he received the William Osler Patient-Oriented Research Award from the University of Pennsylvania. 2004 saw Doty receive the Society of Cosmetic Chemists’ Service Award. A year later in 2005 he was recognized by the Association for Chemoreception Sciences with the Max Mozell Award for Outstanding Achievement in the Chemical Senses.

University of Pennsylvania Smell Identification Test 

Dr. Doty created the University of Pennsylvania Smell Identification Test (UPSIT).

References 
 

Doty, R.L.  Odor perception in neurodegenerative diseases and schizophrenia.   In: R.L. Doty (Ed): Handbook of Olfaction and Gustation. 2nd edition. NY: Marcel Dekker, 2003 

Doty, R.L., Shaman, P., Dann, M.: Development of the University of Pennsylvania Smell Identification Test: A standardized microencapsulated test of olfactory function.  Physiology & Behavior (Monograph) 32: 489–502, 1984.

Doty, R.L., Shaman, P., Applebaum, S.L., Giberson, R., Sikorsky, L., Rosenberg, L.: Smell identification ability: Changes with age. Science 226:1441-1443, 1984.

External links 
 Dr. Richard Doty - University of Pennsylvania Faculty Page
 University of Pennsylvania Smell and Taste Center

Year of birth missing (living people)
Living people
University of Pennsylvania faculty
21st-century American biologists
21st-century American psychologists